The modern pentathlon at the 1976 Summer Olympics was represented by two events (both for men): Individual competition and Team competition. As usual in Olympic modern pentathlon, one competition was held and each competitor's score was included to the Individual competition event results table and was also added to his teammates' scores to be included to the Team competition event results table. This competition consisted of 5 disciplines:

Equestrian, held on July 18 at Bromont.
Fencing, held on July 19 at Université de Montréal. 
Shooting, held on July 20 at L'Acadie.
Swimming, held on July 21 at Olympic Pool.
Cross-country, held on July 22 at Olympic Stadium and Maisonneuve Park.

Boris Onischenko of the Soviet Union was ejected from the competition during the fencing event after it was discovered he had wired his epée with a concealed push button circuit breaker that enabled him to register a hit at any time. Onischenko's results were deleted from the records, and he was spirited away from the Olympic Village almost immediately, never competing in events outside the USSR again.

The other Soviet team members, Pavel Lednev and Boris Mosolov, were allowed to continue individually, but as three athletes are required to compete in a team event, it was ruled that their results would receive no score in the team competition.

Participating nations
A total of 47 athletes from 17 nations competed at the Montreal Games:

Medal summary

Medal table

References

External links
Official Olympic Report

 
1976 Summer Olympics events